The International Solidarity Committee (COSI) was established as an NGO in Venezuela in 1970 by international activists on issues of peace and international solidarity. It is an organizational member of the Executive Committee of the World Peace Council (WPC).

COSI foundation was founded in 1970, as a coordinator of a Latin American and Caribbean integration unit, having as its main objectives:

 promote and teach respect for human rights
 encourage the study and evaluation of the aspects of economic, social, political, legal and military information that affect the maintenance and development of an environment of peace, cooperation, friendship and harmony among peoples
 Rescue and reaffirm the principles of international solidarity
 Promote the Bolivarian ideas about the common destiny of peoples
 Actively participate in the process of popular integration.
 Fostering cultural exchange between peoples

The president of COSI is Lieutenant Commander Victor Hugo Morales; the Secretary General is Deputy Yul Jabour; the Finance Secretary is Carouls Wimmer; the Youth Secretary is Roso Grimau.

References

External links 
COSI blog
Caracas, world capital of peace and anti-imperialist struggle

Political movements in Venezuela
1970 establishments in Venezuela
World Peace Council